Arthur Edward Quinn (born February 26, 1968) is an American actor, model and musician. He played recurring roles in a number of television series, including 2 Broke Girls, Mistresses, and One Day at a Time. From 2006 to 2012 he starred in the Syfy fantasy series Eureka, and in 2019 began starring as President Hunter Franklin in the BET prime time soap opera The Oval.

Early life and education
Quinn was born in Berkeley, California, where he attended St. Mary's College High School and went on to earn a bachelor's degree in history from the University of California, Berkeley in 1991. While in Berkeley, Quinn was a brother of Alpha Delta Phi (California Chapter). He also played rugby for California.

Career

After graduating, Quinn worked as a model in Paris, Barcelona, and Milan, landing parts in more than 35 international television commercials. When he returned to the United States, Quinn landed the starring role of Finn in The WB summer series Young Americans (2000). Later he had a recurring roles on Jack & Jill and CSI: NY. He made his film debut in the 2002 low-budget film Beeper starring Harvey Keitel and later appeared in direct-to-video Starship Troopers 2: Hero of the Federation (2004). From 2006 through 2008, he played Nathan Stark in the Syfy series Eureka, reprising this role once during 2010. 

In 2015 Quinn joined the cast of the ABC series Mistresses. From 2016 to 2017, Quinn had a recurring role in last two seasons of CBS sitcom 2 Broke Girls. In 2018, Quinn had a recurring role in the Netflix series One Day at a Time. Quinn's role as Max Ferraro on One Day at a Time continued as the show transitioned to  Pop (also shown on TV Land and Logo) for the fourth season in 2020. In 2019, Quinn landed the starring role of fictitious President Hunter Franklin in the Tyler Perry  prime time soap opera The Oval.

Music
Quinn  studied with Joe Satriani and played in the Los Angeles-based bands Mad Theory and Scattergood, which led to a recording contract. He handled lead/rhythm guitar and vocals for the band ScatterGood, which has taken a hiatus. Quinn recently did his first solo demo CD, entitled Quinn, with three songs produced by his friend Chris Lloyd: "Because of You", "Cause I Do" and "We Had It Made". Another 5 song EP was released in 2013.

Personal life
Quinn and Heather Courtney-Quinn, a TV and film producer, have been married since 2008.

Filmography

Film

Television

References

External links
 
 

1968 births
20th-century American male actors
21st-century American male actors
American male film actors
American male television actors
Living people
Male actors from Berkeley, California
Male models from California
University of California, Berkeley alumni